Nancy Shuttleworth Rust (September 15, 1928 – June 16, 2018) was an American former politician in the state of Washington. She served in the Washington House of Representatives for the 44th, 1st, and 32nd districts from 1981 to 1997.

References

2018 deaths
1928 births
Politicians from Iowa City, Iowa
Women state legislators in Washington (state)
Democratic Party members of the Washington House of Representatives
21st-century American women